Hristian Emilov Popov (born 5 February 1990 in Plovdiv) is a Bulgarian footballer who currently plays as a midfielder for FCM Schwerin.

References

External links 
  Lokomotiv Plovdiv profile

1990 births
Living people
Bulgarian footballers
First Professional Football League (Bulgaria) players
PFC Lokomotiv Plovdiv players
OFC Sliven 2000 players
PFC Cherno More Varna players
Berliner AK 07 players
FC Montana players
FC Vereya players

Association football midfielders